The discography of iindman, a visual artist and experimental multi-genre music producer in Electronica from South Africa.

Mixtapes

Extended plays

Singles 
 2014: Flowers Rework (Original by Lapalux)
 2015: Moment in Time (feat. Camila Luna & Emamkay)

Production discography 
 2010: Lefika Town - Mo'Molemi, (Rebel Without A Pause - Studio Album)
 2012: Rep My Town - ProfresherKT (Single)
 2014: Macknight - OTEE (Macknight EP)
 2015: Omnipotent - ProfresherKT (Mogote EP)
 2016: Its Only The Beginning - ProfesherKT (Afterschool - Studio Album)

References 

Discographies of South African artists